Dávid Boldižár (born 6 January 1999) is a Slovak professional ice hockey player who currently plays professionally in Slovakia for HC '05 Banská Bystrica of the Slovak Extraliga.

Career statistics

Regular season and playoffs

References

External links

 

1999 births
Living people
HC Slovan Bratislava players
Bratislava Capitals players
HK Spišská Nová Ves players
HC '05 Banská Bystrica players
Slovak ice hockey defencemen
Sportspeople from Košice
Slovak expatriate ice hockey players in Finland